WR 102ka, also known as the Peony star, is a slash star that is one of several candidates for the most luminous-known star in the Milky Way.

Discovery
WR 102ka lies near the Galactic Center and is essentially totally obscured in visible wavelengths. Thus it must be observed in longer wavelength infrared light, which is able to penetrate the dust.  WR 102ka was catalogued in 2002 and 2003 by infrared surveys.  It was observed for the Two-Micron All Sky Survey (2MASS) in the near-infrared J, H, and Ks bands, at 1.2 μm, 1.58 μm, and 2.2 μm, respectively, and the ISOGAL survey of candidate young stellar objects at 7 μm and 15 μm.

Narrowband infrared observations of several spectral features around 2 μm showed that WR 102ka was a Wolf Rayet star with a likely classification of WN10.  It was also proposed as a possible luminous blue variable.

The Spitzer Space Telescope observed WR 102ka at wavelengths of 3.6 μm, 8 μm, and 24 μm on April 20, 2005. These observations allowed the first reliable calculations of the physical properties of this extremely luminous object.

Other luminous Milky Way stars
The closer star WR 25 may be more luminous than WR 102ka.  Another nearer star, Eta Carinae, which was the second-brightest star in the sky for a few years in the 19th century, appears to be slightly more luminous than WR 102ka, but is known to be a binary star system. There is also the more recently discovered Pistol Star that, like the Peony star, derives its name from the shape of the nebula in which it is embedded, and which it has probably created through heavy mass loss via strong stellar winds and perhaps also "mini-supernova-like" eruptions as happened to Eta Carinae around the 1830s–1840s creating the lobes observed by the Hubble Space Telescope.

The luminosities of the Pistol Star, Eta Carinae, and WR 102ka are all rendered somewhat uncertain due to heavy obscuration by galactic dust in the foreground, the effects of which must be corrected for before their apparent brightness can be reduced to estimate their total radiated power or bolometric luminosity. Both Eta Carinae and WR 102ka are believed likely to explode as supernovas or hypernovae within the next few million years.  As is typical of such extremely massive and luminous stars, both have expelled a considerable portion of their initial mass, when originally formed, in dense, massive stellar winds.

See also
 List of most massive stars
 List of most luminous stars
 LBV 1806-20

References

Sagittarius (constellation)
Wolf–Rayet stars
J17461811-2901366